Walter Trusendi (born 3 January 1985) is an Italian former professional tennis player and competes mainly on the ATP Challenger Tour and ITF Futures, both in singles and doubles.

Trusendi reached his highest ATP singles ranking of World No. 299 in August 2011, and his highest ATP doubles ranking of No. 161 in August 2011.

In final matches to date, he has a career record of 8 wins and 10 losses in singles matches, and 39 wins and 24 losses in doubles matches.

In July 2012, Trusendi successfully qualified for his only career ATP Tour main draw match at the 2012 Croatia Open. He won the necessary 3 consecutive matches in qualifying, against Saša Stojisavljević, Damir Džumhur and Bastian Trinker, before falling in the first round to Daniel Brands of Germany 1-6,  6-7(8-10).

ATP Challenger and ITF Futures finals

Singles: 18 (8–10)

Doubles: 63 (39–24)

References

External links
 
 
 

1985 births
Living people
Italian male tennis players
People from Forte dei Marmi
Sportspeople from the Province of Lucca
20th-century Italian people
21st-century Italian people